Nicolae Țică Zamfir (14 December 1944 – 14 September 2022) is a Romanian football manager.

He coached Universitatea Craiova, Bdin Vidin, FC U Craiova, Drobeta Turnu Severin, Chimia Râmnicu Vâlcea and JEF United Ichihara in Japan. While coaching juniors at Universitatea Craiova, he discovered and formed Gheorghe Popescu. Zamfir died of a heart attack on 14 September 2022.

JEF United Ichihara
In July 1999, Zamfir signed with J1 League club JEF United Ichihara which was at the 15th place of 16 clubs in 1st stage in 1999 season. He managed the club from 2nd stage and contributed to the club remaining in J1 League. In 2000 season, although the club was at 11th place in 1st stage, the club won only 1 match in first 8 matches in 2nd stage and he resigned in August.

Managerial statistics

References

External links

1944 births
2022 deaths
Romanian football managers
Expatriate football managers in Japan
Expatriate football managers in Bulgaria
Romanian expatriate football managers
Romanian expatriate sportspeople in Japan
CS Universitatea Craiova managers
FC U Craiova 1948 managers
J1 League managers
JEF United Chiba managers
Sportspeople from Craiova